Max Viinioksa (27 October 1905 – 1 February 1977) was a Finnish footballer. He played in 50 matches for the Finland national football team from 1926 to 1935.

References

External links
 

1905 births
1977 deaths
Finnish footballers
Finland international footballers
Place of birth missing
Association footballers not categorized by position